Algorithms Unlocked is a book by Thomas H. Cormen about the basic principles and  applications of computer algorithms. The book consists of ten chapters, and deals with the topics of searching, sorting, basic graph algorithms, string processing, the fundamentals of cryptography and data compression, and an introduction to the theory of computation.

References

External links
 MIT Press: Algorithms Unlocked

2013 non-fiction books
Computer science books
MIT Press books